Novio, marido y amante ( Boyfriend, husband and lover) is a 1948 Argentine comedy film, directed by Mario C. Lugones and based upon Louis Verneuil's novel Mademoiselle Ma Mere. It premiered on January 22, 1948.

The film centers on a young beautiful woman that was forced to marry with an elderly man, but now it falls in love with his son.

Cast
 Enrique Serrano
 Tilda Thamar
 Tito Gómez
 Miguel Gómez Bao
 Diego Martinez
 Ignacio de Soroa
 Julio Renato
 Alberto Terrones
 Orestes Soriani
 Fidel Pintos
 Bordignon Olarra
 Nelly Panizza
 Jack O'Neill
 Delia Rivier
 Juan Latrónico
 Renzo Zecca
 Marisa Núñez
 Nelly González
 Susana Campos
 Amelita Vargas

See also
 Mademoiselle ma mère (1936)

External links
 

1948 films
1940s Spanish-language films
Argentine black-and-white films
Films based on works by Louis Verneuil
Remakes of French films
Argentine comedy films
1948 comedy films
1940s Argentine films